George Eure, 6th Baron Eure (–1672) was a Parliamentary supporter during the English Civil War and was the only holder of a peerage created before the Interregnum to sit in Cromwell's Upper House.

He inherited the title in 1652 from his cousin William Eure, 5th Baron Eure. The previous heir-presumptive, Sir William Eure, a colonel in the Royalist army who died fighting at the Battle of Marston Moor, is sometimes wrongly stated to have succeeded as 6th Baron.

Mark Noble suggests that as George was not wealthy, he chose the side which was evidently the most powerful. Though he was a peer of the realm, he did not think it beneath him, to sit in the house of commons, as a member for Yorkshire, he accepted a nomination to the Barebones Parliament called by Oliver Cromwell in 1653, and was elected to parliament for the East Riding of that county in the First Protectorate Parliament 1654, and he was elected in 1656 as an MP to the North Riding for the Second Protectorate Parliament. Cromwell, therefore, could not do less than place Eure in his house of lords; he long survived the restoration, and sat in the restored House of Lords.

George Eure died a bachelor in 1672; and was succeeded by his brother Ralph, lord Eure, who joined with the Duke of Monmouth, and others, in petitioning Charles II against the Roman Catholics in, 1680-1; and, Mark Noble thought, was one of those who had the courage to present James Duke of York, as a popish recusant. With Ralph's death, without issue, in 1690, the title became extinct. Another of the brothers was Samual Eure, esq. a colonel in the royal army, and a compounder upon that account for his estate.

A relation of theirs was Isaac Eure (Ewer), esq. who was a colonel in the parliamentary army, and was sent to conduct King Charles I  from the Isle of Wight to Hurst Castle, named one of the commissioners to sit in judgment upon his sovereign, which he did, and signed the warrant for his execution; was one of those who were sent, in 1649 to Ireland. Happily for himself, he died before the restoration, but at that time his estates were confiscated.

Notes
Footnotes

Citations

References

Attribution

1672 deaths
Roundheads
Year of birth unknown
George
English MPs 1653 (Barebones)
English MPs 1654–1655
English MPs 1656–1658
Members of Cromwell's Other House